2015 Speaker of the United States House of Representatives election may refer to:

 January 2015 Speaker of the United States House of Representatives election
 October 2015 Speaker of the United States House of Representatives election